Laughed Last is the debut album by American singer-songwriter Lili Añel, released on the Palmetto Records label.

Track listing
 "Laughed Last" – 3:51
"The Wrong Time" – 5:00
"On the Run" – 5:18 
"Never Ever Say It" – 4:02
"Love Is It" – 4:21
"Dance the Life Away" – 4:21
"Baby When?" – 5:09 
"Say It Isn’t True" – 3:46
"I Still Have You" – 3:39
"Tonight" – 4:14

All compositions by Lili Añel except:
 "The Wrong Time" by Barbara Añel
 "Love Is It" by Lili Añel and Linda Zecchino
 "Dance the Life Away" by Lili Añel and Reuben Slater

Personnel
Musicians
Lili Anel — vocals, guitars
Matt Balitsaris — electric & acoustic guitars, synth programming, percussion, hand claps
Jeff Berman — drums, percussion, midi-vibes
Paul Adamy – bass
Joey Cardello – congas, pandero, cuica on Tonight; congas on Dance The Life Away, djembe on Let Her Go
 Mark Egan – bass on "Love Is It"
 Brian Mitchell – accordion on "Never Ever Say It"
 Barbara Añel – background vocals
 Cornelius Bumpus – saxophone on "Tonight and Baby When?"
 Matthew Kofo Ayanfowora – djembe on "Let Her Go, talking drum on "On the Run"

Engineers 
Scott Ansel – Head engineer
Charlie Dos Santos – Assistant engineer
Jeff Archuletta – Assistant engineer
Liu Ortiz – Assistant engineer
Mastered by A.T. Michael McDonal at Foothill Digital

References

1994 debut albums
Lili Añel albums